Pietro Frosini (9 August 1885 – 2 September 1951) was one of the first famous "stars of the accordion." He was born in Catania, Sicily, in 1885 and began to play the chromatic button accordion at the age of six. In 1905 he emigrated to San Francisco and was discovered by a talent scout for the Orpheum Vaudeville Circuit.

Frosini made one of the first accordion recordings on a cylinder record for Edison in 1907 and made his first Victor recording in 1908. He traveled extensively on the vaudeville circuit in America and abroad and even performed for the King of England.

On the vaudeville circuit, Frosini met and became friends with another great accordionist, Guido Deiro. After seeing the great success Deiro had with his audiences, Frosini adopted some of Deiro's methods: (1) he began playing popular music along with classical and operatic selections, and (2) he pasted a dummy piano accordion keyboard over his buttons, as audiences wanted to hear the more novel and unfamiliar piano accordion.

Frosini gave up vaudeville in 1932 when the "talkies" closed most vaudeville companies; he then became a staff accordionist for WOR radio in New York, a position he held until his death in 1951. Throughout his career, he performed, taught, composed and arranged music for the accordion. He wrote more than 200 original compositions for the instrument. Today there is a "Frosini Society" based in Sweden which was established in 1984 by Swedish accordionist Lars Ek.

References

External links

Frosini Society
Pietro Frosini profile

Book Review of Gunnar M. Ohlander's Pietro Frosini, Dragspelets Trollkarl
Autographed photo of Pietro Frosini inscribed to accordionist Arvid Franzen

Discography
Pietro Frosini on Victor Records.

Streaming audio
Pietro Frosini on Edison Records.
Pietro Frosini at the Library of Congress.

Videos

American accordionists
Vaudeville performers
Polka musicians
American male songwriters
Italian emigrants to the United States
Italian accordionists
1885 births
1951 deaths
20th-century accordionists
20th-century American male musicians